Granville Square is a prominent tower located at 200 Granville Street in the Financial District within the city's downtown core of Vancouver, British Columbia, Canada. Completed in 1973, the building stands at 138.4 metres (454 feet) tall.  The tower and its plaza are located atop the tracks of the Canadian Pacific Railway, and adjacent to Waterfront Station (formerly the CPR station).

Originally built by Marathon Realty to house the headquarters of Canadian Pacific, the building was occupied by The Vancouver Sun and The Province  on the ground floor and some upper floors until 2017 (it is now located at 2985 Virtual Way at Broadway Tech Centre in Vancouver); while Vision Critical occupies the mezzanine. On top of the building is the Vancouver Harbour Control Tower for the float planes landing and taking off on the Burrard Inlet. This control tower is the tallest in the world.

History

The tower was the only completed part of Project 200, a master plan which got its name from the $200 million investment needed from the federal government. The project included office, hotel, and residential towers to be laid over the CP train tracks. It also included the "Waterfront Freeway", a never-completed freeway with ramps leading to parking garages under the office buildings, before the freeway heads under the "Brockton Point tunnel to the North Shore. The project was cancelled due to a lack of funding and grassroots opposition.

Colliers International occupies four floors and is located in the building since 1973.  The current owner of the building is Cadillac Fairview.

See also
 List of tallest buildings in Vancouver
 Vancouver Harbour Water Aerodrome

References

External links

Skyscrapers in Vancouver
Commercial buildings completed in 1973
Modernist architecture in Canada
Skyscraper office buildings in Canada
Brutalist architecture in Canada